The Mannlicher M1895 ("Infantry Repeating-Rifle M95") is a straight pull bolt-action rifle, designed by Ferdinand Ritter von Mannlicher that used a refined version of his revolutionary straight-pull action bolt, much like the Mannlicher M1890 carbine. It was nicknamed the Ruck-Zuck-[Gewehr] by Austrian troops (ruck-zuck spoken as "roock-tsoock", in common language meaning "back and forth [rifle]") and "Ta-Pum" by Italian troops who wrote a song (it) about it during World War I. The primary producers were the ŒWG in Steyr, and FÉG in Budapest. 

Originally they were chambered for the round-nosed 8×50mmR cartridge, but almost all were rechambered to accept the more powerful spitzer 8×56mmR cartridge in the 1930s.

Method of Operation 
The M1895 is unusual in employing a straight-pull bolt action, as opposed to the more common rotating bolt-handle of other rifles. It combines a two lug rotating bolt head, similar in construction to that found on a Mauser rifle with a pair of helical grooves cut in the bolt body to turn the back and forth movement of the bolt handle and body into the rotational movement of the bolt head. The extractor performs both the usual function, and also has a tail attached which interfaces with slots on the cam surfaces of the bolt head to prevent the bolt head from rotating as a result of the striker's spring pressure once it has been unlocked.

The angle of the cam surfaces in the bolt and bolt body is different from the angle at which the locking recesses are cut in the receiver of the rifle, the result is that the first 20 mm of travel of the bolt body results in the rotation of the bolt head but only about 3 mm of rearward movement, this gives mechanical advantage to the system and accomplishes primary extraction.

The result of this is that the user can pull the bolt back and forth in two movements rather than the up-back-forward-down of conventional turn bolt rifles. It is consequently renowned for combining relatively high rate of fire (around 20–25 rounds per minute) with reliability and sturdiness, although this requires decent care and maintenance. During Austro-Hungarian trials in 1892, rifles survived torture testing of firing 50,000 rounds without any form of lubrication.

The rifle is loaded by means of a five-round en-bloc clip, which when loaded with cartridges, is pressed into the magazine of the rifle, where it is retained and acts at the feed lips of the magazine. When the last of the five rounds has been chambered, there is no longer anything retaining the clip in the magazine and it falls out a port in the bottom due to gravity.  There is a button in the front of the trigger guard which allows the user to eject a partially or fully loaded clip from the magazine when the bolt is open to unload the weapon. The clip will be ejected from the weapon quite energetically as the full force of the follower spring will be pressing against it.

The rifle is not designed to be loaded by any other means but the en-bloc clip. Attempts to single feed the rifle in absence of proper clips may cause damage to the extractor as it is not designed with enough travel to overcome the large rims of the 8x50mmR and 8x56mmR cartridges used in the M1895 unless they are fed under the extractor from the clip.

History 

It was initially adopted and employed by the Austro-Hungarian Army throughout World War I, and retained post-war by both the Austrian and Hungarian armies. The main foreign user was Bulgaria, which, starting in 1903, acquired large numbers and continued using them throughout both Balkan and World Wars. After Austria-Hungary's defeat in World War I, many were given to other Balkan states as war reparations. A number of these rifles also saw use in World War II, particularly by second line, reservist, and partisan units in Romania, Yugoslavia, Italy, and to lesser degree, Germany. Post war many were sold as cheap surplus, with some finding their way to the hands of African guerrillas in the 1970s and many more being exported to the United States as sporting and collectible firearms.
The M1895 bolt also served as an almost exact template for the ill-fated Canadian M1905 Ross rifle, though the later M1910 used a complicated interrupted-thread instead of two solid lugs.

Ammunition 

The M1895 was originally chambered in the 8mm M.1893 scharfe Patrone (8×50mmR Mannlicher) cartridge. Between the world wars, both Austria and Hungary converted the majority of their rifles to fire the more powerful 8×56mmR round.Yugoslavia converted at least some of their captured M1895s to 7.92×57mm Mauser, fed by stripper clips instead of the original model's en bloc clip system. This conversion was designated M95/24 and M95M. The M95/24 is often mistakenly attributed to Bulgaria, but 8×57mm IS was never a standard cartridge of the Bulgarian military. These conversions are prized by collectors for their relative scarcity and chambering in a commonly available round, but suffer from a fragile extractor and a lack of replacement parts.

Variants 
For the post World War I conversions see Conversions.

Rifle 
The "Infantry Repeating-Rifle M1895" was the basic variant. It was chambered for the 8×50mmR Mannlicher cartridge. Its iron sights were graduated 300–2600 paces (225–1950 m). It was used during World War I by the majority of the Austro-Hungarian Army troops.

Stutzen 
This stutzen or short rifle (official designation ; "Repeating-Stutzen M1895") was mainly used by special troops (i.e. storm troops) during World War I. It chambered the 8×50mmR Mannlicher cartridge. Its sights were graduated 500–2400 paces (375–1800 m).

Weight: 
Length: 
Barrel length:

Carbine 
The carbine (official designation ; "Cavalry Repeating-Carbine M1895") was chambered 8×50mmR Mannlicher and used by cavalry units of the Austro-Hungarian Army as a replacement of the Mannlicher M1890 carbine. The sights were graduated 500–2400 paces (375–1800 m). Although it originally didn't have bayonet lugs, during World War I it was fitted with stutzen-like front barrel band with bayonet lugs after mounted cavalry units were found ineffective.

Weight: 
Length: 
Barrel length:

Sniper rifle 

The main difference from the standard rifle and sniper was the telescopic sight mount. The scope was mounted slightly to the left so the rifle could be fed by the en-bloc clip. Approximately 6,000 long and short barreled sniper rifles were made in the years 1915–1918.

Conversions 

The M95/30 was a conversion in the First Austrian Republic by Steyr-Mannlicher during 1930–1940. These rifles carry the letter S meaning Spitzer stamped on the barrel. Main modification was the rechambering to 8×56mmR cartridge. Other changes were the conversion of ladder sights from the older pace unit to meters and addition of a brass front sight protector. Many long rifles were cut down to Stutzen length. Most of M95/30s were sent to Bulgaria during 1938–40, where front sight protectors were removed.

The 31.M or M95/31 was a conversion done in the Kingdom of Hungary. Rifles were converted 1931–1935 by FÉG in Budapest and carry the letter H meaning Hegyes Töltény (pointed bullet) stamped on top of the chamber. The conversion included rechambering to the new 8×56mmR pointed bullet cartridge, new metric ladder sights and the addition of a front-sight protector. Long rifles were cut down to carbine length and designated 31/a.M. They were not used for much time and were withdrawn to storage when the new 35M rifle was introduced. Some were reissued during World War II. A small number were rechambered but were not cut down for the Hungarian Governmental Guards; these had special long bayonets.

The M95M or M95/24 was a conversion to 7.92×57mm cartridge by the Kragujevac Arsenal in the Kingdom of Yugoslavia. These rifles feature Yugoslavian M24 Mauser barrels, sights, similar handguards and are fed by five-round stripper clips. Their extractors are prone to breakage when being fired single-shot. Some of these rifles were found in the Kingdom of Greece by the German forces during World War II and were mistakenly attributed Greek origin.

Summary 
Source:

Accessories

Bayonet 

There were two main variants of the bayonet; the first one was the standard bayonet, the second one was the NCO variant that featured a hooked quillion and a golden lanyard. The bayonet was unusual in that the edge faced upwards when mounted on the rifle. Majority of them were made by Œ.W.G. and F.G.GY. Bayonets were originally not serial numbered.

Late in World War I resources were limited and they started manufacturing replacement bayonets. These were fast to produce, cheap and made completely out of metal.

Night sights 

A number of Model 1916 night (Luminous) sights were issued during World War I. The rear night sight is a small brass plate that is placed underneath the rear sight leaf. The front sight clamps around the rifle's front sight base.

Wire destroyer 
A Drahtzerstörer or "wire destroyer" device for Mannlicher type firearms was also sometimes issued with the rifle during World War I. During assaults, when soldiers would run into barbed wire obstacles, the "wire destroyer" would grab one of the wires and the soldier would shoot through it. It could only be used with a mounted bayonet.
Various other improvised wire destroyers existed, some originally designed for the Mosin–Nagant rifle that were captured on the Eastern front were easily modified to fit the M95. Some were also crafted by military blacksmiths.

Users 

: Approx. 4000 rifles were ordered by the Albanian Revolutionary Committee in 1911. Albania also received a number of rifles after First World War as war reparations.
 First Austrian Republic: In service from October 1918 to the Anschluss.	
: In service from 1895 to Dissolution of Austria-Hungary in 1918. Mainly saw action during World War I as the standard issue rifle of the Austro-Hungarian Army.
: Starting in 1898 Bulgaria began importing M95 Mannlicher rifles, in the beginning exclusively from Steyr and later also from Budapest. Approx. 83,000 long rifles and 2,000 carbines were imported. These can be identified by a Bulgarian lion crest stamped on chamber and the manufacturer's name on the left side of the receiver. M95s, including guns captured by the USSR, were used by the post-war People's Republic of Bulgaria.
: Czechoslovakia had about 200,000 Mannlicher M95s in their possession. The Zbrojovka Brno factory manufactured an unknown number of M95 barrels, stocks and barrel bands before switching to Mauser series production. Most were sold to Bulgaria in the 1930s, but some remained in storage until World War II.
 Sudetendeutsches Freikorps
: Finland obtained approximately 2300 rifles during the 1920s in the 8×50mmR Mannlicher caliber. They were marked SA and are valuable among collectors.
: acquired Mannlicher rifles during the interwar period, mostly pre-conversion 8×50mmR rifles. Some ex-Italian carbines were also used until 1946.
: Used by German police and Volkssturm during World War II.
: Greece had a number of M95/24 and M95M rifles chambered for the 8×57mm IS and after the Axis occupation of Greece in April 1941 arrived at the disposal of the Wehrmacht under the designation Gewehr 306(g).
: After the dissolution of the dual monarchy the Hungarian part received its share of M95s.
: Captured on the Italian Front and received as war reparations. M.95s in original caliber were used by colonial troops in Italian East Africa, these are marked AOI for Africa Orientale Italiana. Rifles captured by the British were shipped to India as trainers.
: very limited numbers
 Internal Macedonian Revolutionary Organization: Supplied by the Kingdom of Bulgaria.
: Surplus Austro-Hungarian rifles were used during the Polish-Soviet War and more were received by armed police in the 1920s.
: The elite Wuwei Corps was equipped with a significant number of imported Mannlicher rifles.
: During the Spanish Civil War, the Soviet NKVD Agency supplied the Republican Forces in Spain with 20,000 Mannlicher Wz.95 rifles and carbines purchased from the Polish Ministry of Defense. The rifle shipment did not reach its intended users; it was captured by Franco's Nationalists. Most Spanish Civil War weapons ended up on the U.S. surplus market during 1959–62. These guns may have additional Spanish Civil War markings and various graffiti.
: Issued to second line troops.
: During the First World War, captured rifles were widely used in the Russian army because of the lack of domestic rifles and cartridges for them. Russian captured rifles may carry a Cyrillic letter П (P). Russian efforts to convert their service rifle, the turning bolt-action Mosin–Nagant to self-loading action were unsuccessful, that's why they decided to alter the straight-pull Mannlicher M1895 rifle, but arrived to the conclusion that development of automatic rifles requires a different approach by inventors.
: Captured during the Balkan Wars from Bulgaria and Austria-Hungary during World War I, also received as war reparations in original caliber. Passed on to the Kingdom of Yugoslavia.
: was in service Ukrainian Galician Army.

: Yugoslavia inherited a great number of Mannlicher rifles from territories that were part of Austria-Hungary up to the end of First World War and from the Kingdom of Serbia. Rifles in original configuration were used by the Gendarmerie. Around 122,000 were converted to 7.92×57mm Mauser caliber as M95M and M95/24. Some were used by the post-war Yugoslav People's Army.

See also 
 Mannlicher M1890 Carbine
 Mannlicher M1888
 Weapons of the Austro-Hungarian Empire
 M1895 Lee Navy – An American straight-pull rifle
 Ross rifle – A Canadian straight-pull rifle
 Schmidt-Rubin rifle - A Swiss straight-pull rifle

References

External links 

  M95, M90, and identifying marks
 Modern Firearms – M95/30 (M1895)
 Photogallery of carabine Mannlicher M.95

Weapons and ammunition introduced in 1895
8×50mmR Mannlicher firearms
Firearms by Ferdinand Mannlicher
Mannlicher rifles
Rifles of Austria
Straight-pull rifles
World War I Austro-Hungarian infantry weapons